Hadi Oshtorak (born 29 June 1992) is an Iranian kabaddi player that represents Iran in international matches and also currently plays for Gujarat Giants  in the Indian Pro Kabaddi League. He is regarded as one of the finest all rounders in the Pro Kabaddi League scoring over 50 points.

Career 

He was part of the Iranian squad for the 2018 Asian Games and also played a crucial role in winning historic gold medal in the men's kabaddi team event. He was also a member of the Iranian team which claimed silver medal at the 2014 Asian Games and was also a key member of the national team which emerged as runners-up to India at the 2016 Kabaddi World Cup.

Pro Kabaddi League 
He made his PKL debut for Telugu Titans in season two of the Pro Kabaddi League in 2015. He was then bought by the Patna Pirates for the season three and was part of the Patna Pirates squad which emerged as winners of the 2016 Pro Kabaddi League season. Hadi later signed with U Mumba in 2017 for the fifth season and again returned to Patna Pirates team for the sixth season in 2018.

References 

1992 births
Living people
Iranian kabaddi players
Kabaddi players at the 2014 Asian Games
Kabaddi players at the 2018 Asian Games
Medalists at the 2014 Asian Games
Medalists at the 2018 Asian Games
Asian Games gold medalists for Iran
Asian Games silver medalists for Iran
Asian Games medalists in kabaddi
Pro Kabaddi League players
People from Gorgan
21st-century Iranian people